Dennis McCarthy (March 19, 1814 – February 14, 1886) was an American manufacturer and politician from New York.

Life
He was the son of Thomas McCarthy. He attended Valley Academy in Salina and engaged in the manufacturing of salt. In the early 1840s he went into business operating a general store with his brother-in-law Silas Titus.

He was a Democratic member of the New York State Assembly (Onondaga Co.) in 1845, and was Mayor of Syracuse, New York, in 1853.

He was elected as a Republican to the 40th and 41st United States Congresses, holding office from March 4, 1867, to March 3, 1871. Afterwards he resumed his former business pursuits. In 1878 mayor James J. Belden formed a committee of citizens, St. Joseph's Hospital Aid Society, to look after the interests of St. Joseph's Hospital. McCarthy followed Theodore Dissel as president.

He was a member of the New York State Senate from 1876 to 1885, sitting in the 99th, 100th, 101st, 102nd, 103rd, 104th, 105th, 106th, 107th and 108th New York State Legislatures; and was President pro tempore in 1881, 1884 and 1885. He became Acting Lieutenant Governor of New York in 1885 after the resignation of Governor Grover Cleveland and the succession of Lt. Gov. David B. Hill to the governorship.

He died in Syracuse, New York, on February 14, 1886, and was buried at Saint Agnes Cemetery in Syracuse.

References

Sources

External links

1814 births
1886 deaths
Republican Party members of the New York State Assembly
Republican Party New York (state) state senators
Lieutenant Governors of New York (state)
Politicians from Syracuse, New York
Majority leaders of the New York State Senate
Republican Party members of the United States House of Representatives from New York (state)
19th-century American politicians
Businesspeople from Syracuse, New York
19th-century American businesspeople